Pam Mark Hall (born 1951 as Pamela Ann Mark in San Bernardino, California) is an American singer, songwriter, musician, producer and artist (acrylics and multi-media.)

Career
Cutting her musical teeth on the renaissance explosion of pop, folk and rock in the 1960s, Pam Mark Hall began playing piano at age 6. By age 9, she was playing guitar, writing songs and performing as a soloist. She formed her first group at age 12, The Chantells, a trio of female vocalists who sang pop girl group songs and a few Hall originals. By age 13, Hall had formed a folk group, The Town Folk Singers, with Vicki Stringfellow, Dave Richter and Andy Wade. They won several local and regional competitions. At 14, she helped form a local chapter of the world-renowned vocalist organization, Up With People, in her hometown of Oroville, California. Then in 1967, Hall traveled with a national cast of Up With People, performing in a trio with motion picture star, Glenn Close. In 1968, as a varsity cheerleader, she performed a song she wrote for her mother for hundreds of attendees at a cheerleading camp. The response was overwhelmingly positive and the experience helped launch her solo career.

From 1969 to 1973, Hall attended American River Junior College and Sacramento State University while playing and singing at rallies, coffee houses and underground FM radio stations. She worked during summers at a retreat in Southern CA called Forest Home Conference Center. In addition to working in the bookstore or as a lifeguard, she performed most evenings for the collegiate conferees during the years, 1972–1973. After graduating from college in 1973, she worked on staff at Hollywood Presbyterian Church as liaison between youth outreach program, The Salt Company, and Hollywood High School. During 1974 and 1975, she was an intern at Discovery Arts Guild (an extension of Peninsula Bible Church) in Palo Alto, CA with singer-songwriter, John Fischer.

The year 1975 saw Hall record and release her first album, a classic folk offering, Flying, with the support of John Fischer, Larry James, Dan Collins and the Discovery Arts Guild.

Incorporating folk rock and pop into her second release, 1977's This Is Not A Dream added orchestral touches to Hall's songs as a logical progression in her developing sound.

In 1980, Hall's third release, Never Fades Away was a significant departure from the folk pop feel of her first two albums. Producer Fletch Wiley steered the arrangements toward jazzy pop rock, as her music adopted a more varied approach.

Hall's next project was a lullaby album for children, Good Night Sleep Tight, which she produced in 1982. Other artists involved in the project included Noel Paul Stookey, Debby Boone, John Fischer and Randy Stonehill.

Moving into an '80's pop rock style, Hall released 1984's Supply And Demand, with producer Keith Thomas tailoring the songs in the pop hit styles of the day.

For 1986's Keeper, Hall enlisted folk pop rock veteran Wendy Waldman to cover production duties as the music took on more of a harder '80s pop rock edge.

Returning from a seven-year hiatus from music to her acoustic music roots, Hall released the sometimes bluesy, sometimes melancholy, folk pop masterpiece Paler Shade in 1993 to critical acclaim. A collection of deeply touching songs tastefully produced by guitarist Dave Perkins, Paler Shade ranks as one of the finest singer-songwriter releases from the early '90s.

She is a Grammy and Dove Award nominated artist. Notable artists such as Noel Paul Stookey, Amy Grant, Debby Boone, Kathy Troccoli, Rich Mullins, and The Imperials have collaborated with writing and/or recording her songs.

After meeting and doing gigs together in the 1970s Pam Mark Hall and veteran pop-rock singer-songwriter/record producer/guitarist/vocalist Jerry Chamberlain from the band Daniel Amos joined forces as the duo, Pamelita and Parker, from the fall of 2009–2012 songwriting and performance collaborators.

Hall relocated from Nashville, TN to northern California in 2013 where she continues to write and perform.

References

External links
 
 Follow Pam Mark Hall on Reverbnation
The Official Website of Pamelita & Parker (Pam Mark Hall & Jerry Chamberlain)

Living people
1951 births
American River College alumni
California State University, Sacramento alumni
Musicians from San Bernardino, California
Singer-songwriters from California
People from Oroville, California